Francesco D'Onofrio may refer to:

 François D'Onofrio (born 1990), Belgian football player
 Francesco D'Onofrio (politician) (born 1939), Italian politician and academic